Alta District Court was the district court based in the town of Alta in Finnmark county, Norway. The court served the municipalities of Alta and Loppa. The court was subordinate to the Hålogaland Court of Appeal.  The court was led by the chief judge Bjørnar K. Leistad.  This court employed a chief judge, another judge and four prosecutors.

The court was a court of first instance. Its judicial duties were mainly to settle criminal cases and to resolve civil litigation as well as bankruptcy. The administration and registration tasks of the court included death registration, issuing certain certificates, performing duties of a notary public, and officiating civil wedding ceremonies. Cases from this court were heard by a combination of professional judges and lay judges.

History
On 26 April 2021, the court was merged with the Hammerfest District Court to create the new Vestre Finnmark District Court. At the same time, the court's jurisdiction was enlarged by adding the municipality of Kvænangen from the Nord-Troms District Court judicial region as well.

References

Defunct district courts of Norway
Organisations based in Alta, Norway
2021 disestablishments in Norway